1782 in sports describes the year's events in world sport.

Cricket
Events
 David Harris made his known first-class debut
England
 Most runs – William Bowra 144
 Most wickets – Robert Clifford 24

Horse racing
England
 The Derby – Assassin
 The Oaks – Ceres
 St Leger Stakes – Imperatrix

References

 
1782